Senta Victoria (Vicki) Greene is an American experimental high-energy physicist, the Stevenson Professor of Physics at Vanderbilt University, where she is also Director of Graduate Studies in physics and Director of Diversity, Equity, and Engagement for the College of Arts and Science. Her research involves the properties of the quark–gluon plasma, and the shapes of jets in heavy ion collisions.

Education and career
Greene majored in physics and mathematics at the University of Tennessee, graduating in 1984 with highest honors. She went to Yale University for graduate study in physics, earning a M.Phil. and M.S. in 1987 and completing her Ph.D. in 1992.

After postdoctoral research at the University of Colorado Boulder, she joined Vanderbilt University as an assistant professor in 1994, the first female faculty member in her department. She was tenured as an associate professor in 2000, and was promoted to full professor in 2006. She served as executive dean of the College of Arts and Science from 2008 to 2011, following which she became senior associate dean.

Greene is a member of the US Nuclear Science Advisory Committee, ex-officio as chair of the Division of Nuclear Physics of the American Physical Society (APS). She has also chaired the APS Committee on the Status of Women in Physics, in 2012. Her research collaborations include the PHENIX and sPHENIX experiments on the Relativistic Heavy Ion Collider at Brookhaven National Laboratory, and the Compact Muon Solenoid experiment on the Large Hadron Collider at CERN.

Recognition
Vanderbilt named Greene as the Stevenson Professor of Physics in 2013. She was elected as a Fellow of the American Physical Society in 2014 "for her contributions to the field of nuclear physics and dedicated service to the community in promoting science to the general public and enhancing the participation of women and minorities in science".

References

External links

Year of birth missing (living people)
Living people
American physicists
American women physicists
Particle physicists
University of Tennessee alumni
Yale University alumni
Vanderbilt University faculty
Fellows of the American Physical Society